The 3rd constituency of Baranya County is one of the single member constituencies of the National Assembly, the national legislature of Hungary. The constituency standard abbreviation: Baranya 03. OEVK.

Since 2014, it has been represented by János Hargitai of the Fidesz–KDNP party alliance.

Geography
The 3rd constituency is located in eastern part of Baranya County.

List of municipalities
The constituency includes the following municipalities:

Members
The constituency was first represented by János Hargitai of the KDNP from 2014, and he was re-elected in 2018 and 2022.

References

Baranya 3rd